Daniel Sams is an American football quarterback who is currently a free agent. He last played for the McNeese State Cowboys.

Early years
Sams attended Salmen High School in Slidell, Louisiana. As a senior, he threw for 577 yards and 7 touchdowns, and rushed for 579 yards and 9 touchdowns. As well as playing offense, Sams was also a major contributor on special teams, both as a punter and kick returner.

Sams received a 3 star rating by Rivals.com in the athlete category. He also made PrepStar magazine's All-Southeast Region team.

College career

Kansas State
In 2011, his first year at Kansas State, Sams redshirted as a quarterback and did not see any playing time.

In 2012, Sams was the backup to Heisman candidate Collin Klein. He played in eight games, completing 6 of 8 passes for 55 yards and rushed 32 times for 252 yards and three touchdowns. Due to an injury to Klein, Sams saw significant playing time against Oklahoma State, completing 4 out of 5 passes for 45 yards. He currently holds the record for most rushing yardage by a freshman quarterback in school history.

In 2013, Sams competed for the starting job, but lost to JUCO transfer Jake Waters. He did, however, see limited playing time during the first few games of the year. This included extensive action against Oklahoma State, when he completed 15 out of 21 passes for 181 yards, and rushed 27 times for 118 yards.

McNeese State
On May 28, 2014, Sams announced that he will be transferring to McNeese State University.

References 

1992 births
McNeese Cowboys football players
Kansas State Wildcats football players
Living people
People from Slidell, Louisiana